Rhea Kohan (née Arnold) is an American writer, author of the novels Save Me a Seat (1979) and Hand-Me-Downs (1980).

Biography
Born Rhea Arnold, Kohan grew up in a traditional Jewish home in Brooklyn, New York. Her mother was a homemaker and her father was a school principal who moonlighted as head of the local yeshiva. She studied chemistry in college.

She is the wife of Emmy award-winning writer, producer, and composer, Buz Kohan, and mother of twins Jono and David, and Jenji Kohan.

Published works

References

External links

Living people
Year of birth missing (living people)
American women novelists
American television writers
American women television writers
20th-century American novelists
Writers from Brooklyn
Jewish women writers
Jewish American novelists
20th-century American women writers
Novelists from New York (state)
Screenwriters from New York (state)
21st-century American Jews
21st-century American women